Gustav Bergman (born 4 December 1990) is a Swedish orienteering competitor. He won a bronze medal in the middle distance at the 2013 World Orienteering Championships.

He was born in Stockholm, represents OK Ravinen, and is married to Helena Jansson.

At the 2016 World Orienteering Championships in Strömstad he won a bronze medal in relay with the Swedish team, along with Fredrik Bakkman and William Lind, as well as a bronze medal in the mixed sprint relay.

At the 2019 World Orienteering Championships in Østfold he won a silver medal at the middle distance and a gold medal in the relay with the Swedish team, along with Johan Runesson and Emil Svensk.
Bergman won the 2019 Orienteering World Cup.

Results

World Championship results

World Cup victories

References

External links

1990 births
Living people
Swedish orienteers
Male orienteers
Foot orienteers
World Orienteering Championships medalists
Competitors at the 2017 World Games
Sportspeople from Stockholm
21st-century Swedish people
Junior World Orienteering Championships medalists